Raja Mantri Chor Sipahi is a type of role-playing game that is a popular pastime in India. It involves four playerseach player takes up the role of either the king, Minister , thief or soldier and the Minister (Mantri) has to guess the identity of the thief. Along with other such games, its popularity has decreased in the 21st century.

Rules 
The game begins with making 4 chits namely Raja (2000 points), Mantri (900 points), Chor(0 points) and Sipahi (700 points). Each chit is folded-shuffled and distributed among 4 players with each player picking one chit. Players can open their respective chit to find out their character(which shall not be revealed to anybody). The Sipahi then has to identify the ‘Chor’ from the other 3 players whether they are a “chor” or not. If the Mantri, guesses correctly then the points are retained or else he/she surrenders them to the Chor. If the Sipahi picks the wrong person then the Chor and Sipahi will have to switch points. Several rounds of this game are played before counting the points. The player with the highest score wins the game.

Variations: 

The chits can be King, Solider, Thief, Minister . The person with the Solider chit declares that he is the Solider and has to find the thief from the other 3 players. If more players are to play the game extra chits like Rani “Queen” and “Villager”, are added each with varying points. The King has the highest points followed by the Mantri. Points are awarded to the Solider or thief based on whether the solider guesses the identity of the thief correctly.

References

Indian games
Indian role-playing games